Lewis Moore (born 4 June 1998) is a Scottish footballer who plays for Scottish Championship club Queen's Park as a winger. He previously played for Heart of Midlothian, and also Cowdenbeath, Forfar Athletic, Falkirk and Arbroath on loan spells.

Career
Moore won the Heart of Midlothian U17s Player of the Year award in April 2015 and made his debut for the senior team in the final game of the 2015–16 season in a draw against St. Johnstone. He spent the following season on loan at Cowdenbeath where he scored his first goal in the Scottish Professional Football League against Forfar.

After being loaned to Forfar for the 2018–19 season, Moore was loaned to Falkirk in August 2019. His loan move to Falkirk was ended early.

Moore was loaned to Arbroath in February 2021.

On 21 June 2021, Moore signed for Queen's Park on a permanent basis.

Career statistics

Notes

References

External links
 
 

1998 births
Living people
Scottish footballers
Association football wingers
Heart of Midlothian F.C. players
Cowdenbeath F.C. players
Scottish Professional Football League players
Forfar Athletic F.C. players
Falkirk F.C. players
Arbroath F.C. players
Queen's Park F.C. players
People from Bathgate
Footballers from West Lothian